Carpani is an Italian surname that may refer to
Alberto Carpani (born 1956), Italian singer
Gianluca Carpani (born 1993), Italian football player
Giuseppe Carpani (1751–1825), Italian poet, translator and opera librettist
Rachael Carpani (born 1980), Australian actress 
Ricardo Carpani (1930–1997), Argentine artist 

Italian-language surnames